Jean II de Giblet (died 1315) was a Christian prince of the House of Giblet, an area of the Holy Land, in the 13th-14th century. His family used to be located in the fief of Cerep in Antioch, before the area was taken by the Mamluks. He was married to Marguerite du Plessis.

Jean de Giblet is recorded as witness in a contract signed with Venice by Amalric de Lusignan, Prince of Tyre and governor of Cyprus.

He is mentioned by the medieval historian, the Templar of Tyre:

In early 1300, Jean and Guy d'Ibelin had moved in with their troops from Cyprus in response to an earlier call by the Mongol leader Ghazan to reoccupy the Holy Land.  They established a base in the castle of Nefin in Gibelet on the Syrian coast with the intention of joining Ghazan, but he had already retreated at that point. They attempted to besiege the new city of Tripoli, but in vain, and soon had to reembark for Cyprus.

Notes

References
"Les Familles d'Outre-Mer" by Charles du Cange, p. 333 Online

Christians of the Crusades
1315 deaths
Year of birth unknown
Embriaco family
History of Byblos